Phool Aur Aag is a 1999 Indian Hindi-language action film directed by T L V Prasad, starring Mithun Chakraborty, Jackie Shroff, Harish, Ayesha Jhulka, Archana, Aruna Irani and Rakesh Bedi. The film was a remake of Tamil film Maru Malarchi.

Plot
The Zamindar Deva does everything possible for its residents. He allocates considerable sums for the construction of schools, hospitals, and temples. The result of all the benefits of Deva becomes immeasurable respect from fellow countrymen. But one day, saving a girl from a snake bite, Deva attracts the wrath of people. This creates serious misunderstanding between two villages which results blood bath.

Cast
Mithun Chakraborty as Zamindar Deva
Jackie Shroff as Jaswant
Harish Kumar as special appearance in "Main Gaaon Dil Gaaye"
Dalip Tahil as Suraj
Mohan Joshi as Rattan Choudhury
Kishore Bhanushali
Adi Irani as Mamaji
Archana as Jayanti
Aruna Irani as Deva's mother
Avtar Gill as Match-Maker
Sonia Sahni as Wife of Rattan Choudhary
Shiva Rindani as Shiva
Rakesh Bedi as Gopi
Pramod Moutho as Killer
Disha Vakani
Ayesha Jhulka as item number "Main Gaaon Dil Gaaye"

Songs
"Aankho Me Rehne Lage Hai Nasha" - Jaspinder Narula
"In Hawao Ke Daman Pe Hai" - Jaspinder Narula, Sukhwinder Singh
"Mai Gau Dil Gaya" - Achal, Kavita Krishnamurthy
"Piya Piya Bole Jiya" - Kavita Krishnamurthy, Vinod Rathod
"Saasein Mahek Rahi Hai" - Kavita Krishnamurthy
"Suraj Ke Jaisa Hai" - Achal

References

External links
 

1999 films
1990s Hindi-language films
1999 action films
Mithun's Dream Factory films
Films shot in Ooty
Hindi remakes of Tamil films
Indian action films